David Cobb (September 14, 1748 – April 17, 1830) was a Massachusetts physician, military officer, jurist, and politician who served as a U.S. Congressman for Massachusetts's at-large congressional seat.

Biography
Born in Attleborough in the Province of Massachusetts Bay on September 14, 1748, Cobb graduated from Harvard College in 1766.  He studied medicine in Boston and afterward practiced in Taunton.  He was a member of the Massachusetts Provincial Congress in 1775; lieutenant colonel of Jackson's regiment in 1777 and 1778, serving in Rhode Island and New Jersey; was aide-de-camp on the staff of General George Washington; appointed major general of militia in 1786 and rendered conspicuous service during Shays' Rebellion. He was a charter member of the American Academy of Arts and Sciences in 1780. Cobb was also admitted as an original member of the Society of the Cincinnati in the state of Massachusetts at the conclusion of the war.

Massachusetts Government
He served as a judge of the Bristol County Court of Common Pleas 1784–1796, and as a member of the State house of representatives 1789–1793, and the Massachusetts Senate, and served as Speaker of the Massachusetts House of Representatives and President of the Massachusetts Senate.

Congress
He was elected to the Third United States Congress (March 4, 1793 – March 3, 1795).

Maine
Cobb moved to Gouldsboro in the District of Maine in 1796 and engaged in agricultural pursuits; elected to the Massachusetts Senate from the eastern District of Maine in 1802 and served as president; elected to the Massachusetts Governor's Council in 1808; Lieutenant Governor of Massachusetts in 1809; member of the board of military defense in 1812; chief justice of the Hancock County (Maine) court of common pleas; returned in 1817 to Taunton, where he died on April 17, 1830.  His remains were interred in Plain Cemetery.

Cobb was elected a member of the American Antiquarian Society in 1814.

Legacy
In 1976, David Cobb was honored by being on a postage stamp for the United States Postal Service.

Notes

References
Porter, Joseph Whitcomb: Memoir of Gen. David Cobb and family of Gouldsborough, Maine, and Taunton, Mass (1888).

External links

 The Society of the Cincinnati
 The American Revolution Institute

1748 births
1830 deaths
Harvard College alumni
American militia generals
Continental Army officers from Massachusetts
Fellows of the American Academy of Arts and Sciences
Massachusetts state senators
Presidents of the Massachusetts Senate
Members of the Massachusetts House of Representatives
Speakers of the Massachusetts House of Representatives
Members of the United States House of Representatives from Massachusetts
Politicians from Taunton, Massachusetts
Massachusetts Federalists
18th-century American physicians
People of colonial Massachusetts
Members of the American Antiquarian Society
People from Attleboro, Massachusetts
Aides-de-camp of George Washington